Reginald Douglas Crook, 1st Baron Crook (2 March 1901 – 10 March 1989), was a British civil servant and United Nations official.

A member of the Labour Party, he became a senior civil servant. In 1947 he was raised to the peerage as Baron Crook, of Carshalton in the County of Surrey. He was a Delegate to the United Nations and notably served as Vice-President of the United Nations Administrative Tribunal between 1952 and 1971. He was also Chairman of the National Dock Labour Board from 1951 to 1965.

Lord Crook married Ida Gertrude, daughter of Joseph Haddon, in 1922. She died in 1985. Lord Crook died in March 1989, aged 88, and was succeeded in the barony by his only son Douglas.

Arms

References

Kidd, Charles, Williamson, David (editors). Debrett's Peerage and Baronetage (1990 edition). New York: St Martin's Press, 1990, 

New York Times article on his death

1901 births
1989 deaths
Barons created by George VI